The 47th Annual Daytime Creative Arts Emmy Awards, were presented by the National Academy of Television Arts and Sciences (NATAS), honoring the best in U.S. daytime television programming in 2019. The winners for the creative arts categories were announced on June 26, 2020 via the Twitter, Facebook and Instagram accounts of the Daytime Emmys after the broadcast of the main ceremony. The winners for the digital drama categories were announced on July 19, 2020. The winners for the Children's, Lifestyle and Animation Awards were announced on July 26, 2020, in a live-stream on the Emmys platform, hosted by American comedian Loni Love.

The nominations for both the creative arts and the children's, lifestyle and animation categories were announced alongside the main ceremony categories on May 21, 2020.

Winners and nominees

The winners are listed first, in boldface.

Programming

Performance and Hosting

Animation

Art Direction

Casting

Cinematography

Costume Design

Directing

Editing

Hairstyling

Lighting Direction

Main Title Design

Makeup

Music

Technical Direction

Sound

Special Effects

Writing

Notes

References

External links
 Daytime Emmys website

047 Creative Arts
2020 television awards
2020 in American television